The Ven. Rowland Tracy Ashe Money Kyrle,  MA (2 August 1866 – 26 December 1928) was Archdeacon of Hereford from 1923 to 1928.

He was educated at New College, Oxford and  Wells Theological College; and ordained in 1890. After a curacy in Portsea he was the Rector  of Ribbesford from 1898 to 1902; Vicar of Kentish Town  from  1902 to 1910; and Rector  of Ross-on-Wye from  1910 to 1926.

In 1908, he married Mary Sylvia Shuttleworth, with whom he had one daughter.

Notes

Alumni of New College, Oxford
Alumni of Wells Theological College
Archdeacons of Hereford
1928 deaths
1866 births